Bakrie Sumatera Plantations is an agricultural subsidiary of Bakrie Group headquartered in Jakarta, Indonesia. Bakrie Sumatera Plantations manages an estimated one hundred thousand hectares of rubber and palm oil plantations, a railroad for transporting rubber, and several land banks.

History 
Bakrie Sumatera Plantations was founded in 1911 as N.V. Hollandsch Amerikaanse Plantage Maatschappij, opening its first rubber plantation in Kisaran. In the late 1910s, the company was acquired by United States Rubber Plantation Inc., Sumatra, a subsidiary of United States Rubber Company (USRC). In 1986 Bakrie Group acquired the company from USRC, renaming it to "PT Bakrie Sumatera Plantations" in 1990.

In 1990, Bakrie Sumatera Plantations opened a palm oil plantation in Pasaman, and acquired another one in Bah Jambi from P.T. Agrowiana the next year. In 1992 Bakrie Sumatera Plantations began converting several of its rubber plantations into palm oil plantations due to palm oil's higher profitability and greater endurance of climate change. While the company's palm oil plantations do not make use of its railroad system, as of 2016, Bakrie Sumatera Plantations still used its railroad to transport rubber.

Rolling stock 
The first engines delivered to the company, all 0-6-0T engines, were one Vulcan Iron Works engine, two Davenport engines, and three Orenstein and Koppel engines. In the early 1950s, the company acquired ten Ruston Hornsby engines, its first diesel engines. These engines were scrapped around 2006. Currently, Bakrie Sumatera Plantations operates engines built by Ruston Hornsby, Schöma, and Diema.

Locomotives

Current

Former

See also 
 Schöma

References

Links 
Official site

Palm oil companies of Indonesia
Bakrie Group
Companies based in Jakarta
Agriculture companies established in 1911